MAID may refer to:

Massive array of idle disks
Medical assistance in dying; see Assisted dying (disambiguation) or Euthanasia in Canada which is the official term for use in Canada.